Hisanobu (written: 久信) is a masculine Japanese given name. Notable people with the name include:

 (1571–1602), Japanese daimyō
 (born 1965), Japanese baseball player and manager

Japanese masculine given names